Jo Kyung-jin (born November 14, 1982), known professionally as Jo An, is a South Korean actress. She is best known for the films Lifting King Kong (2009) and My Little Hero (2013), as well as the family drama Jolly Widows (2009) and police procedural Special Affairs Team TEN (2011, 2013).

Filmography

Film

Television series

Variety show

Radio program

Discography

Book

Awards and nominations

References

External links
 
 Jo An on KeyEast
 
 
 

South Korean television actresses
South Korean film actresses
Chung-Ang University alumni
1982 births
Living people
20th-century South Korean actresses
21st-century South Korean actresses
Best New Actress Paeksang Arts Award (film) winners